Barisania honeyi is a species of moth of the family Limacodidae. It is found in northern and central Thailand, northern Vietnam and central Burma on altitudes between 320 and 1,650 meters.

The wingspan is 27–33 mm. The forewings and hindwings are reddish-brown with a yellow outer margin. Adults are on wing in June, August, September, November and December.

Etymology
The species is named for Mr. Martin Honey.

References

External links 
 The Barcode of Life Data Systems (BOLD)

Limacodidae
Moths of Asia
Moths described in 2009